Raymond Narville Russell (born May 1, 1940) is a retired American light-heavyweight boxer. He won a gold medal at the 1971 Pan American Games and competed at the 1972 Summer Olympics.

References

1940 births
Living people
Boxers from Cincinnati
Boxers at the 1972 Summer Olympics
Olympic boxers of the United States
American male boxers
Boxers at the 1971 Pan American Games
Pan American Games medalists in boxing
Pan American Games gold medalists for the United States
Light-heavyweight boxers
Medalists at the 1971 Pan American Games